Lake Bennett may refer to:

 Lake Bennett (Northern Territory), Australia
 Bennett Lake, British Columbia and Yukon, Canada
 Lake Bennett in Faulkner County, Arkansas, U.S.
 Bennett Lake (Minnesota), U.S.

See also
Bennett (disambiguation)